The 1982 Virginia Tech Hokies football team was an American football team that represented Virginia Tech as an independent during the 1982 NCAA Division I-A football season. In their fifth year under head coach Bill Dooley, the Hokies compiled an overall record of 7–4.

Schedule

Players
The following players were members of the 1982 football team.

References

Virginia Tech
Virginia Tech Hokies football seasons
Virginia Tech Hokies football